Inđija Stadium is a sports stadium in Inđija, Serbia, used primarily for association football.

History
Right after the founding of FK Železničar Inđija, the predecessor of FK Inđija, the pitch was closed off with a fence and covered wooden seats were built. The capacity was about 600 seats. A Changeroom as part of the stadium wasn't built until 1962. Until then the Changeroom was in a Sport cafe across the stadium. The wooden seats were replaced with plastic seats in 1970. In 2006 the stadium was renovated. The old removable stand was replaced with a new, modern stand equipped with plastic seats.

After the renovation in 2006, the stadium could hold between 4,000 and 5,000 people. For security measures and for the comfort of the viewers, the capacity was reduced to 3,500 seats.

Plans
FK Inđija has presented, in 2006, the future plans for creating a new stadium on Inđijska Leja and it will have capacity of 9000 plastic seats. Having in mind the perspective of development and the needs of sport athletes, of the Inđija town this stadium, when it is finished, is expected to satisfy all the needs and ambitions. This is all in ambition for club to rise up to the first league playing club.

References

External links
 Stadion FK Inđija

Football venues in Serbia